Waltershausen is a town in the south-western part of the district of Gotha in the state of Thuringia, Germany.

Geography

Geographic location 
Located on the verge of the Thuringian Basin just before the Thuringian Forest, Waltershausen is sometimes referred to as the "gate to the Thuringian Forest".

It is close to the Großer Inselsberg, the fourth-highest mountain in the state.

Town structure 
The town is divided into the seven districts of Fischbach, Schmerbach, Schwarzhausen, Winterstein, Wahlwinkel, Schnepfenthal and Langenhain.

Incorporations 
On July 1 in 1950, Langenhain, Schnepfenthal-Rödichen as well as Wahlwinkel became parts of Waltershausen. 63 years later, on December 31 in 2013, the district of Emsetal (consisting of Fischbach, Schmerbach, Schwarzhausen and Winterstein) was incorporated into the town.

History 
The origin of the town's name can be traced back to the 8th-9th century when, during Franconian times, a settlement called Waltershausen existed. In 1167, the town's landmark Tenneberg Castle was first mentioned in a document.

The first documentary mention of Waltershausen itself dates back to 1209, precisely under the name of „Ulricus, villicius de Waltherißhusin“. It was then a part of the county of Mühlburg under the electorate of Mainz. From 1640 onwards, Waltershausen, then a subordinate to the Amt Tenneberg, became a part of the duchy of Saxe-Coburg and Gotha.

In the early nineteenth century, Waltershausen established its tradition of being a "city of dolls" due to the high number of toy and specifically doll factories in the area. In 1990, however, the industrial production of dolls came to an end.

In 1929, the Thuringian forest railway was extended to Waltershausen, thus providing a direct connection to Bad Tabarz and Gotha.

During World War II, on February 6 in 1945, Waltershausen was among several regional towns to be hit by an attack of U.S. Forces. 12 bombers dropped a total of 120 bombs on the town, causing the destruction of 21 buildings as well as 20 casualties.

Culture

Landmarks and sights 
 , a baroque castle along with a local history museum.
 Klaustor, the main gate of the former city wall.
 Töpfersturm (German for pottery tower), the former workplace of medieval potters outside of the town's center.
 historic Townhall, built in 1441 and fundamentally restored in 1990, the second oldest half-timbered town hall in central Germany.
 Schnepfenthal Salzmann School (Salzmannschule Schnepfenthal), a boarding school specializing in foreign language education.
 the first outdoor gymnastic ground of Germany, founded by Johann Christoph Friedrich GutsMuths.
 town church (1719–23), including the largest baroque organ in the state of Thuringia.

Sports 
Waltershausen offers a variety of sports clubs competing on high levels. Karate athletes of Bushido Waltershausen regularly compete on the national and international stage and have won numerous titles over the years. The town is also a well-known host of regional as well as national table tennis competitions. Its central sports club, ZSG Waltershausen consists of 12 different sports departments.

Media 
There are two renowned radio stations in Waltershausen. In 2009, the online radio channel 0800 Radio Tenneberg went on air with daily coverage. Four years later, TMR-radio.de launched, providing recent news and a variety of music.

Recurring events 

The town's biggest event is the annual town fair, taking place in mid-July under a different motto each year. Another recurring event is the medieval castle fair at the beginning of each September.

In December, usually on the weekend of second advent, the annual Christmas market takes place in front of the town hall. A day before Carnival's Monday, a traditional Carnival's parade has been held in Waltershausen for over 25 years.

Religion 
There are a total of seven churches and chapels in Waltershausen and its surrounding districts. With the exception of a Catholic chapel established during the 20th century in the town, all of the religious institutions are of Protestant Christianity.

In 1993, Waltershausen became an ecclesiastical administrative center as chair of the Protestant-Lutheran church association of Waltershausen-Ohrdruf.

Infrastructure

Industry 
The local economy is highly dependent on its industrial institutions. There are several companies located in or around Waltershausen. One of the most significant examples is a factory by Hako GmbH, where multifunctional equipment transporters called Multicars are being produced.

Rockinger, a trailer hitch producing company, has a factory as well as its headquarters in the town. ContiTech, a subsidiary of Continental, also settled in Waltershausen with one of its factories.

Public transport 

Due to its proximity to the highway A4 and its own entry to one of Germany's most significant highways connecting Frankfurt and Dresden, Waltershausen is well-connected to the surrounding cities of Eisenach, Gotha as well as Erfurt. The highway is also the gateway to various other parts of Germany, making Waltershausen a very central and easily accessible place from a national perspective.

Its traditional and nostalgic concept have made it popular beyond the town's border, attracting even non-local tourists.

There are buses and a train line operating in Waltershausen as well.

Education 
Waltershausen currently has two primary schools, a secondary school as well as the Salzmannschule Schnepfenthal, a high school focussing on foreign language education.

External relations

Sister cities 
International:
 Bruay-sur-l'Escaut, France (Département Nord) (since 1965)
 Wolbrom, Poland (Voivodship Małopolskie) (since 2000)
National:
 Korbach, Germany (Hesse) (since 1990)
 Hanau, Germany (Hesse) (since 1990)

Notable people 

 Johann Matthäus Bechstein (1757-1822), naturalist, forestry scientist and ornithologist
 Heinrich Credner (1809-1876), geologist
 Eduard Ausfeld (1850-1906), historian
 Paul Fridolin Kehr (1860-1944), historian and diplomatist, brother of Hans Kehr
 Hans Kehr (1862-1916), founder of the German bile duct surgery, brother of Paul Fridolin Kehr
 Jannes Fittje (born 1999), racing driver

References

External links
Waltershausen official web page (German)

Towns in Thuringia
Gotha (district)
Saxe-Coburg and Gotha